Frank North (December 27, 1924 – December 19, 2017) was an American football coach. North served as head coach at the Marion Military Institute from 1961 through 1978 and compiled an overall record of 85 wins and 65 losses (85–65) during his tenure there. In December 1978, he resigned his position at Marion and accepted the head coaching position at Livingston University (now the University of West Alabama). From 1979 through his resignation from the school following the 1984 season, he compiled an overall record of 31 wins and 29 losses (31–29).

Head coaching record

College

References

1924 births
2017 deaths
West Alabama Tigers football coaches
Junior college football coaches in the United States
People from Sweetwater, Tennessee